was a town located in Kawabe District, Akita Prefecture, Japan.

As of 2003, the town had an estimated population of 10,366 and a density of 34.43 persons per km². The total area was 301.06 km².

On January 11, 2005, Kawabe, along with the town of Yūwa, was merged into the expanded city of Akita and no longer exists as an independent municipality.

Notable people
 Michio Ashikaga (footballer)
 Mitsuhisa Taguchi (footballer)

External links
Kawabe official website of Akita City

Dissolved municipalities of Akita Prefecture